Sarye pyeollam is a kind of practical guide written by Korean scholar Yi Jae (李縡 1680–1746) of the Joseon Dynasty, which that records and describes important rites and ceremonies based on Neo-Confucianism. The title is translated into "Easy Manual of the Four Rites" or "Convenient Reference to the Four Rites". It consists of 8 volumes in 4 books and was published in 1844 by his descendant, Yi Gwang-jeong (李光正).

See also
 An Hyang
 Korean Confucianism
 Dangui

References

Joseon dynasty works
Korean books
Korean Confucianism
Works about Confucianism
1844 books